In military terms, 91st Brigade may refer to:

 91st Mixed Brigade (Spain)
 91st Brigade (United Kingdom)
 91st Engineer Brigade (Soviet Union)